The Caraculo Solar Power Station is a planned  solar power plant in Angola. The power station is in the planning stage, by a consortium comprising Eni, the Italian energy multinational, in collaboration with Sonangol, the Angolan energy parastatal.

Location
The power station would be located near the small town of Caraculo, in Namibe Province, in southwestern Angola.

Overview
The power station, which will be constructed in phases, is designed to have generation capacity of 50 megawatts, when fully constituted. The first phase with generation output of 25 megawatts, will be built first, then followed by the second stage of equal capacity. Its output is intended to be sold directly to the Empresa Rede Nacional de Transporte de Electricidade (RNT), the national electricity transportation utility company, for integration into the national grid, under a long-term power purchase agreement, which is yet to be signed, as of December 2021.

In December 2021, a final investment decision (FID), was signed between Eni and Sonangol specifying 50/50 ownership in the project. The two shareholders formed a special purpose vehicle company, named Solenova Limited, which will own, design, finance, build, operate and maintain the solar farm. The undisclosed engineering, procurement and construction (EPC) contractor has been selected. Construction is expected to begin in the fourth quarter of calendar year 2022.

Developers
The table below illustrates the corporate entities who own a stake in the special purpose vehicle (SPV) company Solenova Limited:

Benefits
The energy generated by this power station is expected to reduce the country's electricity deficit and to increase the proportion of the Angolan population who are connected to grid electricity.
This renewable energy project is in line with the country's desire to attain 800 megawatts of "installed renewable capacity by 2025".

See also

 List of power stations in Angola
 Quilemba Solar Power Station

References

External links
 Overview of Electricity Energy Sector In Angola As of December 2018.

Solar power stations in Angola
Namibe Province
Renewable energy power stations in Angola